Geoff Ablett (born 13 March 1955) is a former Australian rules footballer who played in the Victorian Football League (VFL) during the 1970s and 1980s. Ablett spent the majority of his career with Hawthorn, playing 202 games on the wing. Ablett finished with short stints at Richmond and St Kilda. His younger brother Gary Ablett Sr is a Hall of Fame inductee. A third brother, Kevin, also played for Hawthorn, Richmond and Geelong. Geoff Ablett was known for his burst of speed as player, winning the Grand Final Sprint competition four times.

Ablett was the station president at Melbourne community radio station Casey Radio, based in the south-eastern suburbs. He held the role from late 2007.

In December 2008, Ablett was elected mayor of City of Casey Council, one of Victoria's biggest councils. 

Ablett was the unsuccessful Liberal Party candidate for the Electoral district of Cranbourne at both the 2010 and 2014 Victorian state election.

Ablett was a councillor at the City of Casey when it was dismissed in 2020. This dismissal of the council followed an investigation by the Victorian Independent Broad-based Anti-corruption Commission into “allegations property developer John Woodman paid City of Casey councillors in exchange for favourable planning votes.” The hearing heard that Ablett “received more than $300,000 from Mr Woodman”, including “$5,000 a month to look after” a racehorse that Mr Woodman was a part owner of. Mr Ablett responded that racehorses “are very expensive to keep.”

His son Ryan, who was once rookie listed at Hawthorn, died in 2009 at the age of 27.

Statistics

|- style="background-color: #EAEAEA"
! scope="row" style="text-align:center" | 1973
|style="text-align:center;"|
| 2 || 7 || 0 || 5 || 71 || 8 || 79 || 17 ||  || 0.0 || 0.7 || 10.1 || 1.1 || 11.3 || 2.4 || 
|-
! scope="row" style="text-align:center" | 1974
|style="text-align:center;"|
| 2 || 25 || 20 || 29 || 364 || 81 || 445 || 65 ||  || 0.8 || 1.2 || 14.6 || 3.2 || 17.8 || 2.6 || 
|- style="background-color: #EAEAEA"
! scope="row" style="text-align:center" | 1975
|style="text-align:center;"|
| 2 || 22 || 14 || 19 || 304 || 43 || 347 || 60 ||  || 0.6 || 0.9 || 14.5 || 2.0 || 16.5 || 2.9 || 
|-
! scope="row" style="text-align:center;" | 1976
|style="text-align:center;"|
| 2 || 23 || 11 || 22 || 365 || 55 || 420 || 58 ||  || 0.5 || 1.0 || 15.9 || 2.4 || 18.3 || 2.5 || 
|- style="background-color: #EAEAEA"
! scope="row" style="text-align:center" | 1977
|style="text-align:center;"|
| 2 || 24 || 8 || 15 || 395 || 78 || 473 || 75 ||  || 0.3 || 0.7 || 16.5 || 3.3 || 19.7 || 3.1 || 
|-
! scope="row" style="text-align:center" | 1978
|style="text-align:center;"|
| 2 || 25 || 15 || 21 || 354 || 91 || 445 || 62 ||  || 0.6 || 0.8 || 14.2 || 3.6 || 17.8 || 2.5 || 
|- style="background-color: #EAEAEA"
! scope="row" style="text-align:center" | 1979
|style="text-align:center;"|
| 2 || 16 || 11 || 24 || 231 || 67 || 298 || 46 ||  || 0.7 || 1.5 || 14.4 || 4.2 || 18.6 || 2.9 || 
|-
! scope="row" style="text-align:center" | 1980
|style="text-align:center;"|
| 2 || 19 || 16 || 23 || 274 || 96 || 370 || 66 ||  || 0.8 || 1.2 || 14.4 || 5.1 || 19.5 || 3.5 || 
|- style="background-color: #EAEAEA"
! scope="row" style="text-align:center" | 1981
|style="text-align:center;"|
| 2 || 17 || 19 || 23 || 273 || 62 || 335 || 43 ||  || 1.1 || 1.4 || 16.1 || 3.6 || 19.7 || 2.5 || 
|-
! scope="row" style="text-align:center" | 1982
|style="text-align:center;"|
| 2 || 24 || 21 || 26 || 360 || 131 || 491 || 89 ||  || 0.9 || 1.1 || 15.0 || 5.5 || 20.5 || 3.7 || 
|- style="background-color: #EAEAEA"
! scope="row" style="text-align:center" | 1983
|style="text-align:center;"|
| 4 || 5 || 8 || 8 || 70 || 21 || 91 || 15 ||  || 1.6 || 1.6 || 14.0 || 4.2 || 18.2 || 3.0 || 
|-
! scope="row" style="text-align:center" | 1984
|style="text-align:center;"|
| 4 || 11 || 4 || 9 || 146 || 25 || 171 || 31 ||  || 0.4 || 0.8 || 13.3 || 2.3 || 15.5 || 2.8 || 
|- style="background-color: #EAEAEA"
! scope="row" style="text-align:center" | 1985
|style="text-align:center;"|
| 15 || 11 || 6 || 10 || 187 || 31 || 218 || 38 ||  || 0.5 || 0.9 || 17.0 || 2.8 || 19.8 || 3.5 || 
|- class="sortbottom"
! colspan=3| Career
! 229
! 153
! 234
! 3394
! 789
! 4183
! 665
! 
! 0.7
! 1.0
! 14.9
! 3.5
! 18.3
! 2.9
! 
|}

Notes

External links 

1955 births
Living people
Geoff
Australian rules footballers from Victoria (Australia)
Hawthorn Football Club players
Hawthorn Football Club Premiership players
Richmond Football Club players
St Kilda Football Club players
Two-time VFL/AFL Premiership players